Pablo Javier Quatrocchi (born 19 January 1974) is an Argentine football coach and former player who played as a central defender. He is the current manager of Estudiantes de La Plata's reserve squad.

Born in Quilmes, Quatrocchi played for Quilmes, Estudiantes de La Plata, VfL Wolfsburg, Veracruz, San Lorenzo, and finally retired in Club Necaxa as a defender and captain.

Coaching career
After retiring, Quatrocchi was appointed as a youth coach at Quilmes. He was later appointed as the club's sporting director and also served as coordinator of the youth players. On 7 June 2014, it was announced that Quatrocchi has signed his first professional club Quilmes as a head coach and will be making his debut as a first-team coach. He left on 30 November 2014.

On 3 December 2015, he was appointed as manager of Douglas Haig. He was released in May 2016.

In June 2017, Quatrocchi was appointed as a youth coordinator for Estudiantes LP. On 24 February 2019, he was appointed as caretaker manager for the first team. It lasted until March 2019, where Gabriel Milito was appointed.

References

External links
 
 
  

1974 births
Living people
Sportspeople from Buenos Aires Province
Argentine footballers
Association football defenders
Argentine Primera División players
Liga MX players
Bundesliga players
Club Necaxa footballers
Estudiantes de La Plata footballers
C.D. Veracruz footballers
VfL Wolfsburg players
Quilmes Atlético Club footballers
Argentine expatriate footballers
Expatriate footballers in Germany
Expatriate footballers in Mexico
Argentine football managers
Argentine Primera División managers
Quilmes Atlético Club managers
Estudiantes de La Plata managers